Parvathi Ennai Paradi is a 1993 Indian Tamil-language romantic drama film written and directed by V. Sekhar. The film stars Saravanan and newcomer Sri Parvathi, with Janagaraj, Vijayakumar, Srividya, Lalitha Kumari, Charle and Vasu Vikram playing supporting roles. It was released on 23 July 1993.

Plot 
Rajadurai (Vijayakumar) is a wealthy man and highly respected figure in his village. He has a spoiled daughter named Parvathi (Sri Parvathi). Venkatraman (Janagaraj) is a newly appointed Tamil teacher of a college in Rajadurai's village. Unlike other teachers, students like his way of teaching and friendly approach. Parvathi really appreciates Venkatraman and she has private tuitions with the teacher. Venkatraman is married to Gayathri (Srividya), they have a son named Siva.

Siva is a short-tempered person who cannot tolerate injustice. While studying in college, he beat up the minister's son who raped his classmate and was later expelled from the college. Afterwards, his father found him a job in a newspaper company. One day, the company owner cut the finger of a poor labourer in front of Siva. Siva, in turn, cut the owner's finger and was sent to jail.

Siva comes back from jail and goes back to his parents. At his arrival, Parvathi clashes with Siva, their bickering continues every time they meet. Siva later becomes the manager company of Rajadurai's company. Siva and Parvathi slowly fall in love with each other. Ramesh (Vasu Vikram), Rajadurai's nephew, is a wicked womaniser and he wants to appropriate Rajadurai's company. So Ramesh decides to marry Parvathi at all costs. What transpires next forms the rest of the story.

Cast 

Saravanan as Siva
Sri Parvathi as Parvathi
Janagaraj as Venkatraman
Vijayakumar as Rajadurai
Srividya as Gayathri
Lalitha Kumari
Charle as Pattinathar
Vasu Vikram as Ramesh
Ganeshkar
Haja Shareef
Kovai Babu
Idichapuli Selvaraj as Iyer
LIC Narasimhan as College principal
Pasi Narayanan as Munuswamy
MLA Thangaraj as the company owner
Singamuthu

Soundtrack 
The music was composed by Ilaiyaraaja, with lyrics written by Vaali, Gangai Amaran and Piraisoodan.

Reception 
Malini Mannath of The Indian Express gave a negative review and labelled the film "cliched". R. P. R. of Kalki said Ilaiyaraaja was the only saving grace of the film.

References

External links 

1990s Tamil-language films
1993 films
1993 romantic drama films
Films directed by V. Sekhar
Films scored by Ilaiyaraaja
Indian romantic drama films